The Nethercutt Collection is a multi-storied museum and car collection complex located in Sylmar, California. It was founded by J.B. Nethercutt in 1971 and its centerpiece is the prestigious automobile collection of the Nethercutt-Richards family that contains over 250 cars. It is widely regarded as one of the greatest car museums in the world.§

The museum also houses collections of mechanical musical instruments, including orchestrions, player pianos, music boxes, antique furniture, and an automotive research library. Another unique piece in the collection is the Canadian Pacific Railway's famous Royal Hudson steam locomotive No. 2839 built in 1937. The semi-streamlined Royal Hudson steam locomotive is one of four that survive today.

The Collection is considered as one of the greatest teams of all time in Concours d'Elegance competitions and car shows with its world-class restoration shop, holding the most Concours titles of any competitor worldwide including a record six Best of Show victories at Pebble Beach.

History
In 1956 J.B. Nethercutt (1913–2004), the co-founder of Merle Norman Cosmetics, purchased two cars: a 1936 Duesenberg Convertible Roadster and a 1930 DuPont Town Car, needing refurbishing. The DuPont restoration, which Nethercutt thought would take a few weeks, instead took 18 months and over $65,000. By 1958, his rebuilt project claimed its first prize — the coveted “Best of Show” award at the prestigious Pebble Beach Concours d'Elegance in California. Over the next decade he would purchase several other antique automobiles and restore them.

San Sylmar 

In the late 1960s Nethercutt ascended to CEO and Chairman of Merle Norman Cosmetics and purchased several acres of land in Sylmar, Los Angeles to develop a warehouse for his growing car collection and connect it to a new Merle Norman manufacturing plant. Instead of a warehouse, he decided to develop a personal six floor, ten-story-tall Art Deco penthouse palace that will serve duel-purpose as a free of charge museum when he was not living there, and in 1971 the San Sylmar tower estate was constructed.

The first two stories of the tower; the Lower and Grand Salon, featured most of J.B.'s vehicle collections, with a closed off 30,000 square-foot car workshop being connected to the Lower Salon. The Grand Salon features the most expensive vehicles and was architecturally inspired by a mix of 1920s-30s New York City luxury car showrooms, grand ballrooms and opulent theatres. The third story features an awards room, a vast collection of hood ornaments, and a cafeteria for the Collection's employees. The fourth story consists of a 10,000 square foot music room with several large antique music boxes and player pianos, with a massive Wurlitzer theatre organ in the centerpiece of the room. The fourth floor also features a Louis XV-styled dining room and a large private kitchen that J.B. used for private dinners with a personal chef. The fifth floor has a theatre which includes a 24 karat gold proscenium arch next to a massive storage room of pianos and musical records. There was a sixth floor private penthouse that included a full balcony which J.B. used as his secondary residence that was closed off from tours.

The 1994 Northridge earthquake structurally damaged the sixth floor penthouse which led to the floor's deconstruction.

Museum expansion 

In 2000 the Collection expanded and constructed a new 40,000 square foot display building directly across the street which was separately called the Nethercutt Museum. In comparison with the Collection which requires reserved guided tours, the newer Nethercutt Museum is openly self-guided. The building also contains the Nethercutt Automotive Research Library and Archive, which is considered one of the greatest in the world. Outside of the Museum contains a CPR steam locomotive Royal Hudson No. 2839 is presented together with a 1912 Pullman private car.

After J.B. Nethercutt's death in 2004, the collection was handed down to Jack Nethercutt II and Helen Richards-Nethercutt. The collection had a budget of around $2.5 million a year. In 2011 OPI Products and Merle Norman Cosmetics styled its "Hussy" perfume and lipstick line after the Collection's distinctively red "Hussy" 1934 Packard LeBaron Sport Phaeton, which is nicknamed after John Hussey.

From 2020 to 2021 the collection was closed due to the COVID-19 pandemic. In 2022 the museum underwent major cosmetic renovations, including a new logo wordmark.

Vehicles

Cars 
The Nethercutt Collection has over 250 prestigious, antique, and exotic vehicles from American and European origin, notably including from Aston Martin, Austin-Healey, Bentley, Bugatti, Cadillac, Duesenberg, Ferrari, Lincoln, Maybach, Mercedes-Benz, Rolls-Royce and others. Several vehicles in the Collection were formerly owned by politicians and celebrities such as Abdullah Al-Salim Al-Sabah, Marjorie Merriweather Post, Tim Allen, Constance Bennett, and others.

Notable individual cars 

 The Twenty Grand - The one-off Arlington Torpedo Duesenberg Model SJ which was made to be a key display at the 1933 Chicago World's Fair. Its design by Gordon Buehrig is considered to be the most beautiful Duesenberg ever built and is one of the most valuable cars in the world. 
 Bugatti Type 51 Dubos - Former Bugatti Type 51 race car famous for its modified one-off coupe design by Louis Dubos and is considered one of the most beautiful cars in the world.

Locomotive 
The Collection acquired Canadian Pacific Railway's famous Royal Hudson steam locomotive No. 2839 which was built in 1937, it is displayed with a fully restored 1912 Pullman private sleeping car outside of the museum complex. No. 2839 steam locomotive is one of four that survive today.

Car restoration  
The Nethercutt's 30,000 square-foot car restoration complex is credited with being one of the finest in the world, with nearly all of the vehicles on display being in pristine condition and fully drivable. Many of the vehicles undergo several re-restorations to stay competitive for Concours d'Elegances and car shows.

Concours d'Elegance 

The Nethercutt Collection team competes in prestigious Concours d'Elegance competitions and car shows, widely being considered as one of the greatest teams of all time. The Collection has the most Best of Show titles of any competitor in the world, including a record six Best of Show titles at the pinnacle Pebble Beach and five at Amelia Island, both more than any other competitor.

Best of Show titles 
Below is a list of known notable Best of Show titles:

 Pebble Beach (6): 1958, 1959, 1969, 1970, 1980, 1992
 Amelia Island (5): 2005, 2007, 2011, 2013, 2016
 Palos Verdes (3): 2007, 2009, 2012
 Las Vegas (2): 2019, 2022
 Kirkland (1): 2007
 Dana Point (1): 2011
 La Jolla (1): 2022

Music 
The Collection houses dozens of world-class antique music sets, including mechanical musical instruments, phonographs, massive orchestrions, dozens of player pianos and music boxes, and antique furniture.

The Nethercutt Collection's Wurlitzer theatre pipe organ is the largest theatre organ in the Western U.S. and third largest in the world.

Nethercutt Automotive Research Library 
The museum wing contains the Nethercutt Automotive Research Library which contains archived encyclopedic engineering materials on American and European vehicles since the end of the 19th century, such as owner's manuals and engineering documents.

It is considered one of the ten greatest automotive research libraries in the world.

Events 
The Collection hosts silent film screenings and organ concerts in the fourth floor music room, using the Wurlitzer theatre pipe organ.

From 2008 to 2010 the Collection's vehicles served as the lead car and transport of the Grand Marshals of the Rose Parade, including Emeril Lagasse, Cloris Leachman, and Chesley Sullenberger.

Picnic tour 
Every year until his death in 2004, J.B. Nethercutt would take dozens of cars from the Collection with his family, friends, and invited guests on a parade-like cruise through the hills to a picnic at Frazier Park with catered foods from the professional chefs at the Collection. The event was one of the most exclusive items on any car lovers wish list as Autoweek magazine described it, "You can be as rich as Bill Gates or have a collection as big as that of the Sultan of Brunei, but you don't get a personal invitation from J.B. Nethercutt himself." The vehicle insurance of each picnic was stated to be in the multi-millions.

Recognition 
The Collection has been named as one of the greatest car collections in the world by The New York Times, Los Angeles Times, Motor Trend, CNET, CBS, and several other publications. It is listed as one of America's five greatest automobile museums by Autoweek.

Television personality and car collector Jay Leno described the Collection as a "Smithsonian-style effort on the history of transportation in America" and "The hall of fame for cars.”

In popular culture 
The Royal Hudson steam locomotive No. 2839 appeared in the 1980 Coal Miner's Daughter film, which won an Academy Award. The 1949 film The Great Gatsby featured the 1936 Duesenberg SJN now owned by the collection.

In 2005 the collection was exclusively featured on the Motor Trend series My Classic Car. From 2022 to 2023 several of the collection's vehicles were featured on the CNBC series Jay Leno's Garage; the Bugatti Dubos, 1933 Hispano-Suiza J12, 1930 Cadillac V-16, 1928 Isotta Fraschini Landaulet Type 8A, 1967 Ferrari 365 California Spyder, and the Twenty Grand Duesenberg.

Gallery

See also
 List of music museums
 List of automobile museums

References

External links
 
 

Museums in Los Angeles
Automobile museums in California
Musical instrument museums in the United States
Public venues with a theatre organ
Nethercutt-Richards family